Backe is a small hamlet in Carmarthenshire, Wales.

Villages in Carmarthenshire
St Clears